The Chief Medical Officer of Hungary is a government official, head of the National Public Health Center. The current office holder is Cecília Müller. The chief medical officer reports to the Ministry of Human Capacities through the undersecretary for health.

Responsibilities 
The chief medical officer has several responsibilities and a complex jurisdiction which is stated in the 5.1 section of 18/2019. (VI. 6.) directive of the Minister of Human Capacities on the organizational and operational rules of the National Public Health Center. These are including but not limited to:
 organizational operational duties
 supervising, controlling and inspectional roles
 managing and supervising duties related to public health

Replacement
In case of the chief medical officer's absence or inability, the deputy chief medical officer I takes over the power and duties of the surgeon general; in case of the deputy chief medical officer I's absence or inability, the deputy chief medical officer II shall fulfill the duties.

History
During the Kingdom of Hungary, the establishment of a public health organization is related to Queen Maria Theresa. The first comprehensive public health regulation was released in 1770 under the title Generale normativum in re sanitatis. The Generale normativum established the office of physicus (chief medical officer).
The chief medical officer is the traditional name of the office. However, the name of the organization responsible for public health administration has changed several times since 2010. The Minister of Human Capacities, by releasing the 18/2019. (VI. 6.) directive on the organizational and operational rules of the National Public Health Center, overruled the 51/2017. (X. 15.) ministerial directive. Previously the Office of the Chief Medical Officer was part of the National Public Health and Medical Officer Service.

Former chief medical officers
1991-1995: Pál Kertai
1995–1997: Endre Morava
1997–2001: Ilona Molnár
2001: Alán Pintér
2001–2002: Katalin Lun
2002–2003: György Ungváry
2004–2006: László Bujdosó
2007–2010: Ferenc Falus
2010–2015: Judit Paller
2016–2018: Tamás Szentes
2018: Attila Kovács
2018– incumbent: Cecília Müller

References 

Hungary
Medical and health organisations based in Hungary